Charles Wadleigh Eldridge (October 16, 1877 – May 15, 1965)  was a Massachusetts businessman and politician who served in both branches of the Massachusetts legislature as a member of the Board of Aldermen and as the seventeenth Mayor of Somerville, Massachusetts.

Eldridge was a delegate to the 1920 Republican National Convention.

In addition to his duties as an officeholder, starting in 1893, Eldridge worked as a salesman for Chase & Sanborn.

Eldridge had  married Edith daughter of Harriett J. Brown.  Eldridge had five children. Raymon W. Eldridge; Arthur F. Eldridge; Warren P. Eldridge; Louise Eldridge; Charlotte Eldridge

See also
 1915 Massachusetts legislature
 1916 Massachusetts legislature
 1917 Massachusetts legislature

Notes

1877 births
Massachusetts city council members
Mayors of Somerville, Massachusetts
Republican Party members of the Massachusetts House of Representatives
Republican Party Massachusetts state senators
1920 United States presidential election
1965 deaths